Morris Township is the name of some places in the U.S. state of Pennsylvania:

Morris Township, Clearfield County, Pennsylvania
Morris Township, Greene County, Pennsylvania
Morris Township, Huntingdon County, Pennsylvania
Morris Township, Tioga County, Pennsylvania
Morris Township, Washington County, Pennsylvania

Pennsylvania township disambiguation pages